Jose & Maria's Bonggang Villa is a 2022 Philippine television romantic comedy series broadcast by GMA Network. Directed by John Lapus, it stars Dingdong Dantes and Marian Rivera in the title roles. It premiered on May 14, 2022 on the network's Sabado Star Power sa Gabi line up replacing Agimat ng Agila. The series concluded on August 27, 2022 with a total of 16 episodes. It was replaced by Running Man Philippines in its timeslot.

Cast and characters
Lead cast
 Dingdong Dantes as Jose Villa
 Marian Rivera as Maria Cabangbang-Villa

Supporting cast
 Zonia Mejia as Mae Cabangbang
 Jamir Zabarte as Jae-Z Lopez
 Johnny Revilla as King Villa 
 Benjie Paras as Mr. Nero
 Pekto as Sol Banayad
 Shamaine Buencamino as Aurora "Mama Au" Cabangbang 
 Pinky Amador as Janice Villa
 Hershey Neri as Margarita "Marielou" Cabangbang
 Loujude Gonzalez as Robert "Buboy" Banayad

Ratings
According to AGB Nielsen Philippines' Nationwide Urban Television Audience Measurement People in television homes, the pilot episode of Jose and Maria's Bonggang Villa earned a 13.5% rating.

References

External links
 
 

2022 Philippine television series debuts
2022 Philippine television series endings
Filipino-language television shows
GMA Network original programming
Philippine comedy television series
Television shows set in the Philippines